Dustin David Nippert (born May 6, 1981) is an American former professional baseball pitcher. He played for the Arizona Diamondbacks and Texas Rangers of Major League Baseball, and the Doosan Bears and KT Wiz of the KBO League. Nippert won the KBO League Most Valuable Player Award in 2016. With eight seasons in the KBO, Nippert holds the record for the longest career of any foreign player.

Early life and education
Nippert grew up in the small Ohio town of Beallsville, where he played baseball for Beallsville High School.  He attended West Virginia University, where he played college baseball for the Mountaineers in 2002.

Career

Major League Baseball
The Arizona Diamondbacks selected Nippert in the 15th round of the 2002 Major League Baseball draft. He made his major league debut against the Pittsburgh Pirates on September 8,  with the same organization that drafted him. On March 28, he was traded to the Texas Rangers for Jose Marte.

On June 29, 2008, Nippert threw a seven-inning no-hitter for Triple-A Oklahoma City RedHawks against the Omaha Royals.

The 2009 season is best on record for Nippert in his major league career, when he compiled a 5–3 record with an ERA of 3.88 in 69.2 innings for the Rangers. During the next year, he was able to shake off a scary incident on July 19, 2010, when he was hit on the side of the head by a line drive hit by Austin Jackson against the Detroit Tigers. The ball was hit so hard that it ricocheted off of his head and past third base into left field. Nippert walked off the field smiling to a standing ovation in Detroit but was placed on the 15-day DL after the game.

Korea Baseball Organization
On March 3, 2011, Nippert signed with the Doosan Bears of the Korea Baseball Organization, after an attempt to sign with a Japanese baseball team had failed. Due to his solid performances in a Doosan uniform, the team's fans have christened him "Ninunim" (Korean: 니느님), with the name being a portmanteau of his last name and the Korean word for God "Hanunim" (하느님). In the 2015 KBO post-season, he pitched  scoreless innings during the Bears run to the fourth Korean Series championship in the team's history. On November 14, 2016, he won KBO League Most Valuable Player Award, becoming the fourth foreign player to be awarded in the 34-year history of the league.

On January 23, 2017, Nippert re-signed with the Doosan Bears for another year, earning $2.1 million per year, which is the highest annual income ever of a foreign player in the Korea Baseball Organization. Nippert pitched to a 14–8 record with a 4.06 ERA during the regular season, and started Game 1 of the 2017 Korean Series.

On January 4, 2018, Nippert signed with the KT Wiz. The Doosan Bears had recommended he retire, but Nippert had a strong will to extend his active service. He signed a $1 million contract with the Wiz. On June 29, 2018, with a victory against the NC Dinos, Nippert became the first foreign pitcher in the KBO league to win 100 games in his career.

Personal life
Nippert is married to a South Korean woman, who is his second wife. The couple have two children together, Levi and Owen. He was previously married to an American woman for 10 years, until 2014.

Filmography

Television show

See also 
 List of KBO career win leaders

Further reading
두산 '對 삼성 필승카드' 니퍼트, 3연패를 막아라 (in Korean). Retrieved May 15, 2015.

References

External links

Career statistics and player information from Korea Baseball Organization

1981 births
Living people
Arizona Diamondbacks players
Texas Rangers players
Baseball players from West Virginia
Major League Baseball pitchers
People from Beallsville, Ohio
Sportspeople from Wheeling, West Virginia
Ohio Valley Fighting Scots baseball players
West Virginia Mountaineers baseball players
Missoula Osprey players
South Bend Silver Hawks players
El Paso Diablos players
Tennessee Smokies players
Tucson Sidewinders players
Oklahoma RedHawks players
Frisco RoughRiders players
Oklahoma City RedHawks players
KBO League pitchers
American expatriate baseball players in South Korea
Doosan Bears players
KT Wiz players
American people of English descent
American people of German descent